Grown Up Movie Star is a 2010 Canadian drama film written, directed and co-produced by Adriana Maggs. Shawn Doyle, Jill Knox Gosse and Paul Pope are the other co-producers. The film was produced by Pope Productions and distributed in Canada by Mongrel Media.

Plot
Ray is a former ice hockey player who is convicted of drug charges for smuggling drugs following his first game in the NHL. After he comes back to his Newfoundland home, his wife Lillian leaves to seek fame in Hollywood with another man. Ray is left with his daughters, high schooler Ruby and her 11-year-old sister Rose. Ray pursues a homosexual relationship with gym teacher James, while avoiding the advances of Jennifer.  After Ruby catches her father with James, she explores her sexuality with newly arrived American student Will, her best friend Laura, and Ray's best friend Stuart. Stuart is a paraplegic, shot in a hunting accident by Ray (causing Ray to import the drugs to help Stuart make money).  The drama examines the dynamic of the strained and uncertain relationships of all parties.

Cast
 Shawn Doyle as Ray Fry
 Tatiana Maslany as Ruby Fry
 Jonny Harris as Stuart Walsh
 Julia Kennedy as Rose Fry
 Mark O'Brien as Will
 Steve Cochrane as James
 Andy Jones as Bill
 Sherry White as Lillian
 Susan Kent as Jennifer
 Mary Walsh as Receptionist

Production
The film was produced by St. John's based Pope Productions. Filming was conducted in Newfoundland at Flatrock and St. John's.  The cast included every member of comedy team Dance Party of Newfoundland.

The soundtrack was written by Elliott Brood. Telefilm Canada provided another $440,000 in funding. The Harold Greenberg Fund and the Canadian Film or Video Tax Credit provided additional budgetary support.

Presentations
The film was shown at the Sundance Film Festival in January 2010 and at the festival it won the "World Cinema Special Jury Prize for Acting". It was released to general audiences in Canada on 29 January 2010.

See also
 List of LGBT films directed by women

References

External links
 
 Grown Up Movie Star at Northern Stars
 Grown Up Movie Star at Pope Productions (producer)
 Grown Up Movie Star at Mongrel Media (distributor)

2010 films
Canadian drama films
English-language Canadian films
Films shot in Newfoundland and Labrador
Films set in Newfoundland and Labrador
Canadian LGBT-related films
2010 LGBT-related films
LGBT-related drama films
2010 drama films
2010s English-language films
2010s Canadian films
English-language drama films